Panteras de Miranda is a Venezuelan professional basketball club based in Miranda. The club competes in the Liga Profesional de Baloncesto (LPB).

References

External links
Official site 
Latin-Basket.com Team Page

Basketball teams in Venezuela